Lake Tota is the largest lake in Colombia, located in the east of Boyacá department, inside the Sugamuxi Province, it is the source of the Upia River which flows into the Orinoco River basin.

The major town on the lake is Aquitania, located on its eastern side. Other nearby villages include Tota, Iza and Cuítiva.

Lake Tota was an important religious center for the Muisca culture. The name Tota comes from the Chibcha language of the Muisca and according to linguist Mariana Escribano its main name refers to "Astronomic Observatory", relating to its sacred uses for that culture. There are legends which relate to the way the lake was formed by the hands of ancient ancestors.

The area around Lake Tota is one of the major onion producing regions of Colombia. The western shore of the lake is a popular tourist destination for Colombians.

The average water temperature of 13 °C allowed for the introduction of rainbow trout (Onchorynchus mykiss) which created a valuable wild fishery (a mounted specimen in Restaurante Lucho, Aquitania, reportedly early in the 1990s, weighed 7 kg) and cage culture aquaculture, but predation on native fish species as led to the probable extinction of the pez graso or grease fish (Rhizosomichthys totae) believed native to only this lake.

Lake Tota is a breeding ground for several threatened or endangered bird species, including the least bittern (Ixobrychus exilis bogotensis), the Colombian ruddy duck (Oxyura jamaicensis andina), the Bogotá rail (Rallus semiplumbeus) and Apolinar's wren (Cistothorus apolinari).  The last confirmed sighting of the Colombian grebe (Podiceps andinus), now considered to be extinct, was at Lake Tota.

Etymology 
In the Chibcha language of the Muisca people, Tota means "Farmfields of the river".

Geography 

Gallery

See also 
 Monster of Lake Tota
 Muisca religion
 Lake Guatavita, Lake Iguaque, Lake Suesca, Siecha Lakes

References

External links 

  Lake Tota in the Province of Sugamuxi - videos and more information - accessed 02-05-2016

Lakes of Colombia
Geography of Boyacá Department
Tota
Underwater diving sites in Colombia
Tota
Lakes
Tota